James O'Brien may refer to:

Politicians 
 James O'Brien (died 1771), Irish nobleman and politician
 James O'Brien (1806–1882), Irish judge and British MP for Limerick City
 James O'Brien (Canadian politician) (1836–1903), Canadian senator
 James O'Brien (New Brunswick politician) (1824–1922), Canadian blacksmith and political figure in New Brunswick
 James O'Brien (New Zealand politician) (1874–1947), New Zealand politician
 James O'Brien (U.S. Congressman) (1841–1907), United States Representative from New York
 James Bronterre O'Brien (1805–1864), Irish-born Chartist leader, reformer and journalist
 J. F. X. O'Brien (James Francis Xavier O'Brien, 1828–1905), Irish rebel and British MP
 James H. O'Brien (1860–1924), United States Representative from New York
 Jay O'Brien (Virginia politician) (born 1951), American politician in Virginia
 James C. O'Brien, first and former Special Presidential Envoy for Hostage Affairs during the Obama administration
 James William O'Brien (1879-1960), American farmer and politician

Others 
 James O'Brien, 3rd Marquess of Thomond (1769–1855), British naval officer
 James O'Brien (broadcaster) (born 1972), British journalist and presenter, primarily on LBC radio
 James O'Brien (athlete) (1925–1988), Canadian sprinter
 James O'Brien (hurler) (born 1983), Irish hurler
 James O'Brien (internet radio) (born 1973), Canadian internet radio journalist, founder and producer of RantMedia
 James O'Brien (oceanographer) (1935–2016), American oceanographer
 James O'Brien (piper) (1823–1885), Irish musician
 James F. O'Brien, American computer graphics researcher
 James O'Brien (filmmaker) (born 1969), American film director, screenwriter and producer
 James Joseph O'Brien (1930–2007), British clergyman
 James O'Brien (horticulturist) (1842–1930), winner of the Victoria Medal of Honour
 James O'Brien, Australian musician, bassist for The Boat People (active since 2000)
 James J. O'Brien was one of many known aliases used by famed con artist and repeated Brooklyn Bridge seller, George C. Parker

See also
 Jamie O'Brien (disambiguation)
 Jim O'Brien (disambiguation)